Call the Police may refer to:

Radio program
Call the Police (radio program), an old-time radio crime drama

Songs
"Call the Police" (G Girls song)
"Call the Police" (LCD Soundsystem song)
"Call the Police", a song by Ivi Adamou
"Call the Police", a song by James Morrison from Undiscovered
"Call the Police", a song by Thin Lizzy from Shades of a Blue Orphanage
"Call the Police", a song by Twista from The Perfect Storm
"Call the Police, a Nat King Cole song from season 3 of Theme Time Radio Hour